Theodore Roosevelt Kupferman (May 12, 1920 – September 23, 2003) was a Republican member of the United States House of Representatives from New York and a judge of the New York Supreme Court.

Biography
Kupferman was born in New York City. He graduated from DeWitt Clinton High School (1937), City College of New York (1940), and Columbia Law School (1943).

He was a member of the legal department of Warner Bros. Pictures from 1943 until 1948 and from 1949 until 1951. He was a member of NBC's legal department from 1951 until 1953. He served as president of the City Club of New York from 1956 to 1958. He was a counsel and legislative assistant to Stanley M. Isaacs, the New York City Council minority leader, from 1958 to 1962, during which time he wrote The Family Legal Advisor (Greystone, 1957); it was later republished by Ace Books. Kupferman was an assistant and adjunct professor of law at New York Law School from 1959 until 1964.

He was a member of the New York City Council from 1962 until 1966. Kupferman was elected to Congress in 1966, defeating William vanden Heuvel to fill the vacancy caused when John V. Lindsay resigned to become Mayor of New York City.  He was elected to a full term in November 1966 and served from February 8, 1966, to January 3, 1969. In the fall of 1966 Kupferman proposed a special committee to review the Warren Commission's work and conclusions, but the proposal was not acted on.

In 1969 Kupferman became a justice of the New York Supreme Court, and he served until 1996.  After retiring from the bench he returned to practicing law, and represented clients including Abraham Hirschfeld and the Patrolmen's Benevolent Association of the City of New York.

Kupferman died in New York City on September 23, 2003.  He was interred at Kensico Cemetery in Valhalla, New York.

Sources

External links

 

Columbia Law School alumni
City College of New York alumni
1920 births
2003 deaths
New York Law School faculty
Republican Party members of the United States House of Representatives from New York (state)
20th-century American politicians
DeWitt Clinton High School alumni
Burials at Kensico Cemetery